Superior Court of Macau Building is the home of the supreme court of Macau and the second court of appeal.

Construction of the court house began in 1997 and was completed in 1999 in time for the handover. The court building is located next to the Macau Legislative Assembly Building in Nam Van Lake area and located within Cathedral Parish.

The three storey structure uses various types of stones on a concrete core:

 bushamered Portuguese limestone 
 polished gray lined marble – arabescato 
 Portuguese black cleft slate 
 Norwegian Cleft Alta Quartzite

Steel, glass, copper and wood are other materials used throughout the building.

The building was built by local architectural firm Mario Duarte Duque.

See also

 across the lake on the west side is Macau Government Headquarters, former residence of the Governor of Macau and more recently the offices of the Governor (until 1999).
 Court Building, Macau

External links

 Superior Court - Macau SAR of PRC

Landmarks in Macau
Government buildings in Macau
Government buildings completed in 1999
1999 establishments in Macau